Tilak Richard Weerasooriya, MBBS (Ceylon), D.M.Sc (Kyushu), (20 November 1950 – 20 February 2022) was a Sri Lankan physician, academic, and professor emeritus. He was a pioneer in the field of Andrology in Sri Lanka. 

He was also the former Dean - University of Ruhuna (Faculty of Medicine), Senior Lecturer - University of Peradeniya (Anatomy - Faculty of Medicine), and Deputy Vice Chancellor (Academic) - Kotelawala Defence University.

Early life and education 
Weerasooriya was born on 20 November 1950, in Gampola, to Maurice Weerasooriya (1907–1990), Chief Education Officer, and Emily Weerasooriya (1926–2017). He had 4 siblings, Nandani, Nisala, Deepa and Asoka Weerasooriya.
He attended Richmond College, Galle for his primary & secondary education, and later entered the University of Peradeniya where he obtained his MBBS in 1977.
He was a member of the Weerasooriya family of Dodanduwa and Hikkaduwa.

Personal life 
Tilak married Mirani Weerasooriya in 1980, they had three children; Senal, Sahan and Semali.

Academic career 
After completing his MBBS at the University of Peradeniya, Weerasooriya later joined Kyushu University's Department of Anatomy, Fukuoka, in the island of Kyushu in Japan, in order to obtain his PhD. His PhD was on the Micro vasculature of the testis, using electron microscopy. He specialised in Andrology.

Weerasooriya established the following, considered a first in Sri Lanka 
 Andrology Clinic - With Lab facilities for, research & training needed for medical and paramedical personnel.
 Sperm Bank - With a Donor Sperm insemination programme.
 National IVF Lab - At Mahamodera Hospital.

Death 
Weerasooriya died on 20 February 2022, aged 70.

Academic work (Publications) 
 Weerasooriya, Tilak R., and Torao Yaniamoto. "Three-dimensional organisation of the vasculature of the rat spermatic cord and testis." Cell and tissue research 241.2 (1985): 317–323.
 T.R. Weerasooriya, & Wattage, A. P. P. (1997). An analysis of the pregnancies that occurred following in-utero insemination.
 Ilayperuma, I., W. D. Ratnasooriya, and T. R. Weerasooriya. "Effect of Withania somnifera root extract on the sexual behaviour of male rats." Asian Journal of Andrology 4.4 (2002): 295–298.
 Weerasooriya, Tilak R. "Laboratory assistance in the management of infertility." (1997).
 Fernando, L., J. Gromoll, T. R. Weerasooriya, E. Nieschlag, and Manuela Simoni. "Y‐chromosomal microdeletions and partial deletions of the Azoospermia Factor c (AZFc) region in normozoospermic, severe oligozoospermic and azoospermic men in Sri Lanka." Asian journal of andrology 8, no. 1 (2006): 39–44.
 Weerasooriya, M. V., T. R. Weerasooriya, N. K. Gunawardena, W. A. Samarawickrema, and E. Kimura. "Epidemiology of bancroftian filariasis in three suburban areas of Matara, Sri Lanka." Annals of Tropical Medicine & Parasitology 95, no. 3 (2001): 263–273.
 Weerasooriya, M. V., E. Kimura, D. A. Dayaratna, T. R. Weerasooriya, and W. A. Samarawickrema. "Efficacy of a single dose treatment of Wuchereria bancrofti microfilaria carriers with diethylcarbamazine in Matara, Sri Lanka." The Ceylon Medical Journal 43, no. 3 (1998): 151–155.
 Karunarathne, Y. A. U. D., L. D. A. M. Arawwawala, A. P. G. Amarasinghe, T. R. Weerasooriya, and U. K. A. Samarasinha. "Physicochemical, phytochemical, and nutritional profiles of root powder of Asparagus racemosus (Willd) of Sri Lankan origin." Asian J. Pharmacogn 3, no. 3 (2019): 29–35.
 Ilayperuma, I., W. D. Ratnasooriya, and T. R. Weerasooriya. "Methanol and water extracts of Withania somnifera roots has no abortifacient effect in rats." (2002).
 T.R Weerasooriya, and I. M. R. Goonewardene. "Sperm preparation and in utero insemination in the management of subfertility." Ceylon Medical Journal 41 (1996): 54–56.
 Karunarathne, Y. A. U. D., A. P. G. Amarasinghe, T. R. Weerasooriya, U. K. A. Samarasinghe, and L. D. A. M. Arawwawala. "Asparagus racemosus (Willd) of Indian Origin: in Terms of Physico-Chemical, Phyto-Chemical and Nutritional Profiles." (2020).
 Fernando, H. H. L. K., R. Senevirathne, and T. R. Weerasooriya. "can varicocelectomy Improve the Seminal Fluid Parameter Abnormalities?." (2012).
 Fernando, H. H. L. K., R. Senevirathne, P. M. Rodrigo, and T. R. Weerasooriya. "Can Clomiphene Citrate Improve the Quality of Seminal Fluid Parameters in Idipathic Oligoasthenoteratozoospermic Males." (2014).
 WEERASOORIYA, TR, and T. YAMAMOTO. "POSTNATAL-DEVELOPMENT AND THE 3-DIMENSIONAL ORGANIZATION OF THE TESTICULAR LYMPHATICS IN THE RAT." In JOURNAL OF ELECTRON MICROSCOPY, vol. 35, no. 1, pp. 95–95. WALTON ST JOURNALS DEPT, OXFORD, ENGLAND OX2 6DP: OXFORD UNIV PRESS UNITED KINGDOM, 1986.
 Fernando, L., J. Gromoll, T. R. Weerasooriya, E. Nieschlag, and S. Simoni. "Frequency of Y-chromosome microdeletions and partial deletions of AZFc region in normozoospermic, severe oligozoospermic and azoospermic groups in Sri Lanka." In INTERNATIONAL JOURNAL OF ANDROLOGY, vol. 28, pp. 92–92. COMMERCE PLACE, 350 MAIN ST, MALDEN 02148, MA USA: WILEY-BLACKWELL, 2005.
 Amarasinghe, D. M. Y., T. R. Weerasooriya, and I. M. R. Goonewardene. "Oocyte cryopreservation-a cost effective method."

References

References

1950 births
2022 deaths
People from Colombo
People from Galle
Sri Lankan medical doctors
Alumni of Richmond College, Galle
Alumni of the University of Peradeniya
Alumni of the University of Sri Lanka (Peradeniya)
Sinhalese physicians
Sinhalese academics
Sri Lankan medical researchers
Kyushu University alumni
Sri Lankan academics
Academic staff of the University of Peradeniya
People associated with the University of Peradeniya
Peradeniya
Sri Lanka
Sri Lanka
Academia in Sri Lanka
Research
Researchers
Academics
Academics
Sri Lankan academics
Academics from Galle